Events in the year 1824 in Brazil.

Incumbents
 Monarch – Pedro I

Events
 March 25 – the Brazilian Constitution of 1824 was adopted, establishing a hereditary Catholic monarchy headed by the emperor Dom Pedro I. May 13 – the War of Independence of Brazil ended with the Treaty of Rio de Janeiro, in which Portugal recognized Brazil's sovereignty
 October 12 – the Confederation of the Equator, a short-lived separatist movement in northeastern Brazil, was declared by Manuel de Carvalho Pais de Andrade.
 December 15 – the Battle of Jenipapo took place, in which Brazilian rebels defeated Portuguese troops in the state of Piauí

Births
 24 January - João Manuel Mena Barreto
 17 February - José Antônio Correia da Câmara

Deaths
 August 20 – João José da Cunha Fidié, a Portuguese general who led the Portuguese forces in the province of Piauí and was killed in the Battle of Jenipapo
 September 6 – João Félix Pereira, a Brazilian colonel who fought in the province of Bahia and was wounded in the Siege of Salvador.
 October 20 – Álvaro da Costa de Sousa de Macedo, a Brazilian politician and diplomat who served as the first minister of foreign affairs''' of Brazil and negotiated the Treaty of Rio de Janeiro with Portugal.

References

 
1820s in Brazil
Years of the 19th century in Brazil
Brazil
Brazil